Katharine Sweeney Hayden (born May 30, 1942) is an American attorney and jurist serving as Senior United States district judge of the United States District Court for the District of New Jersey.

Early life and education 
Born in New York City, Hayden earned a Bachelor of Arts degree from Marymount Manhattan College in 1963, a Master of Arts from Seton Hall University in 1971, and a Juris Doctor from Seton Hall University School of Law in 1975.

Career 
She was a law clerk for Judge Robert L. Clifford of the New Jersey Supreme Court from 1975-76. After her clerkship she became an Assistant United States Attorney at the United States Attorney's Office for the District of New Jersey from 1976-78. She was in private matrimonial law practice in New Jersey from 1978–91, and then became a judge for the New Jersey Superior Court (Family Division) from 1991-97.

Federal judicial service 
Hayden was nominated by President Bill Clinton on May 6, 1997, to a seat on the United States District Court for the District of New Jersey vacated by H. Lee Sarokin. She was confirmed by the United States Senate on September 25, 1997, and received her commission four days later. Hayden assumed senior status on May 30, 2010.

Hayden continues her connection to her alma mater, Seton Hall University School of Law, serving as an adjunct professor teaching course on Persuasion & Advocacy and Sentencing, and frequently employing Seton Hall Law students as judicial clerks and interns.

Personal life 
Hayden is married to Joseph A. Hayden, Jr., a criminal defense attorney and partner at the New Jersey law firm of Walder Hayden & Brogan. She has two sons, including Matt Sweeney, a musician and founding member of the band Chavez.

References

Sources 

1942 births
Living people
Assistant United States Attorneys
Judges of the United States District Court for the District of New Jersey
Marymount Manhattan College alumni
Lawyers from New York City
Seton Hall University School of Law alumni
Superior court judges in the United States
United States district court judges appointed by Bill Clinton
20th-century American judges
21st-century American judges
20th-century American women judges
21st-century American women judges